The 25th Tank Corps was a corps of the Soviet Red Army. It was part of the 12th Army. It took part in the Soviet invasion of Poland in 1939.

Organization 
 4th Light Tank Brigade
 5th Tank Brigade
 1st Motor Rifle Brigade

Reference 

Tank corps of the Soviet Union